Movie Star may refer to:

 Movie star, an actor who is famous for their starring, or leading, roles in motion pictures

Music
"Moviestar" (Harpo song), a 1975 song
"Moviestar" (Stereophonics song), a 2004 song
"Movie Star" (song), a 2007 song performed by Róisín Murphy
 "Movie Star", a song by Prince from the 1998 box set Crystal Ball
 "Movie Star", a song by Cracker from the 1993 album Kerosene Hat
 "Movie Star", a song by Rascalz from the 2002 album Reloaded
"I Wanna Be a Movie Star" (also known as "Movie Star"), a 2017 song by Bill Wurtz

Other uses
Movie Star (company), a New York City-based clothing manufacturer
"The Movie Star", an episode of the American television series Smash
Movie Stars (TV series), a 1999 American sitcom

See also
Superstar
Celebrity